MPTC may refer to:

Mandal Parishad Territorial Constituency, a political subdivision in India
Maryland Police and Correctional Training Commission
Ministry of Posts and Telecommunications, Cambodia, a ministry in the government of Cambodia
Moraine Park Technical College, in the Wisconsin Technical College System

See also
 MPTCP, multipath TCP